Hole is the debut studio album by gothic rock band One-Eyed Doll. It was released on January 1, 2007. Featuring band members Kimberly Freeman on guitar and Scott Sutton on drums.

Track listing

Personnel 

Music by Kimberly Freeman 
Guitar, Lyrics and Vocals by Kimberly Freeman 
Drums and Bass by Scott Sutton
Produced by Jason Rufuss Sewell
Mastered by Eric Broyhill

External links 
Hole|One-Eyed Doll

2007 albums